Players and pairs who neither have high enough rankings nor receive wild cards may participate in a qualifying tournament held one week before the annual Wimbledon Tennis Championships.

Seeds

  Kaia Kanepi (qualified)
  Johanna Larsson (first round)
  Ksenia Pervak (second round)
  Bethanie Mattek-Sands (qualified)
  Zhang Shuai (second round)
  Simona Halep (second round)
  Evgeniya Rodina (second round)
  Patricia Mayr (first round)
  Sophie Ferguson (first round)
  Ekaterina Bychkova (second round)
  Maria Elena Camerin (moved to main Draw)
  Maša Zec Peškirič (second round)
  Michaëlla Krajicek (qualifying competition)
  Stéphanie Dubois (qualifying competition, lucky loser)
  Vesna Manasieva (qualifying competition)
  Anastasia Pivovarova (qualifying competition, lucky loser)
  Shenay Perry (qualified)
  Lilia Osterloh (first round)
  Kathrin Wörle (first round)
  Gréta Arn (qualified)
  Jelena Dokic (second round)
  Andrea Hlaváčková (qualified)
  Stéphanie Cohen-Aloro (first round)
  Kristína Kučová (first round)

Qualifiers

  Kaia Kanepi
  Nuria Llagostera Vives
  Romina Oprandi
  Bethanie Mattek-Sands
  Shenay Perry
  Anastasiya Yakimova
  Gréta Arn
  Mirjana Lučić
  Kurumi Nara
  Monica Niculescu
  Andrea Hlaváčková
  Eleni Daniilidou

Lucky losers

  Stéphanie Dubois
  Anastasia Pivovarova

Qualifying draw

First qualifier

Second qualifier

Third qualifier

Fourth qualifier

Fifth qualifier

Sixth qualifier

Seventh qualifier

Eighth qualifier

Ninth qualifier

Tenth qualifier

Eleventh qualifier

Twelfth qualifier

External links

2010 Wimbledon Championships on WTAtennis.com
2010 Wimbledon Championships – Women's draws and results at the International Tennis Federation

Women's Singles Qualifying
Wimbledon Championship by year – Women's singles qualifying
Wimbledon Championships